The Pilgrim Woman (La pellegrina) is a 1579 play written by Girolamo Bargagli of Siena that had been performed for the first time on 2 May 1589 in Florence, after the author's death in 1586, on the occasion of the marriage of Ferdinand I de' Medici, Grand-Duke of Tuscany, with Christina of Lorraine, granddaughter of the former queen-mother of France, Catherine de' Medici. Six then-famous composers from Florence contributed music, including some of the most virtuosic vocal writing of the period, early examples of monody. The opening aria, Dalle piu alte sfere, is believed to be by Emilio de' Cavalieri (Palisca, Norton Anthology of Music/ Heller, Music in the Baroque, p 23), although it is sometimes attributed to Antonio Archilei, whose wife Vittoria had sung it in the role of Armonia in the 1589 production.

The intermedi have been played by the Huelgas Ensemble, in 1998; by the Hollands Vocaal Ensemble, in 2003; by the Capriccio Stravagante Renaissance Orchestra, in 2007; and, in selections, by Consort Astræa, in 2009. A staged version was mounted in 1989 in Minneapolis by the Ex Machina Baroque Opera Ensemble. In 2014 the Texas Early Music Project, in Austin, gave the first U.S. performance of the 21st century.

Notes

References
 Banham, Martin, ed. 1998. The Cambridge Guide to Theatre. Cambridge: Cambridge University Press. .
 D. P. Walker, D. P. 1963. Musique des Intermedes de "La Pellegrina", (CNRS, Paris), (reprinted 1986).
 New Grove Dictionary entries under INTERMEDIO and INTERMEDE, (there were also intermedes at the French court).
 www.operabaroque.com (in French)
 Massimo Colella, Rinascimento ludens: Girolamo Bargagli e i «giuochi» delle veglie senesi, in «La parola del testo», 2023.

Italian plays
1589 plays
European court festivities